Sapphire Textile is a Pakistani textile and retail company based in Lahore, Pakistan. The retail sector of it was founded in 2014 by Nabeel Abdullah. A subsidiary of the Sapphire Group of Companies, it is a vertically integrated textile manufacturer, producing cotton yarn, fabric, and finished garments. Sapphire's retail sector began as a women’s apparel brand but quickly grew into a lifestyle brand with products ranging from cosmetics, menswear, children's garments, accessories and linen. As of January 2022, Sapphire operates 35 stores nationwide with approximately 1100 employees. 

In 2021, the company had a turnover of over US$800 million, with an asset base of over US$500 million.

The company has also diversified into the power generation and dairy sectors. Sapphire Dairies Private Limited operates a mechanized dairy farm based on 100 acres near Manga, Lahore, and Sapphire Electric Company has a combined cycle plant in Muridke.

References

Manufacturing companies based in Lahore
Textile companies of Pakistan
Companies listed on the Pakistan Stock Exchange